Leo & Liz in Beverly Hills is an American sitcom starring Harvey Korman, Valerie Perrine and Sue Ball that was broadcast from April 25 to June 6, 1986 on Friday nights at 8:30 p.m ET on CBS.

Summary
Leo and Liz Green were nouveau riche social climbers who had just moved to posh Beverly Hills from New Jersey and were desperate to fit in with their new surroundings, which they found to be quite intimidating.  They had typical sitcom problems including zany servants, odd neighbors, and pretentious, snobbish in-laws, as their daughter Mitzi (Sue Ball) had married into a family of "old" (by Beverly Hills standards, that is) money.

The pilot for this program had been aired the fall before as part of George Burns Comedy Week.  However, the program failed to deliver an audience as a mid-season replacement and was canceled after only six regular weekly episodes were aired.

Cast
Harvey Korman as Leo Green
Valerie Perrine as Liz Green
Deborah Harmon as Diane Fedderson
Kenneth Kimmins as Jerry Fedderson
Sue Ball as Mitzi Green
Julie Payne as Lucille Trumbley
Michael J. Pollard as Leonard

Episodes

References
Brooks, Tim and Marsh, Earle, The Complete Directory to Prime Time Network and Cable TV Shows 1946–Present

External links
 

1980s American sitcoms
1986 American television series debuts
1986 American television series endings
CBS original programming
English-language television shows
Fictional married couples
Television series about couples
Television series by Universal Television
Television series created by Steve Martin
Television shows set in Beverly Hills, California